Tom Moriarty (born April 7, 1953, in Lima, Ohio) is a former American football defensive back in the National Football League. Moriarty played for the Atlanta Falcons from 1977 to 1979 and again in 1981 as well as playing one season with the Pittsburgh Steelers in 1980. Moriarty also played for the Michigan Panthers in the USFL.

References

External links
Tom Moriarty profile at NFL.com

1953 births
American football defensive backs
Atlanta Falcons players
Bowling Green Falcons football players
Living people
Sportspeople from Lima, Ohio
Pittsburgh Steelers players
Players of American football from Cleveland